Karl-Heinz Spickenagel (17 January 1932 – 19 March 2012) was a German footballer.

The goalkeeper won 29 caps for the East Germany national team until 1962.

In the East German top-flight Spickenagel played 189 matches.

References

External links
 
 
 

1932 births
2012 deaths
German footballers
Association football goalkeepers
East German footballers
East Germany international footballers
1. FC Frankfurt players
DDR-Oberliga players
Footballers from Berlin